is a passenger railway station located in the town of Tadaoka, Osaka Prefecture, Japan, operated by the private railway operator Nankai Electric Railway. It has the station number "NK21".

Lines

Layout
The station consists of two opposed side platforms. The platforms are independent of one another, and passengers wishing to change platforms must exit and re-enter the station.

Platforms

Adjacent stations

History
Tadaoka Station opened on 11 July 1925.

Passenger statistics
In fiscal 2019, the station was used by an average of 9346 passengers daily.

Surrounding area
 Tadaoka Post Office Station West
 Tadaoka Municipal Tadaoka Junior High School Station East

See also
 List of railway stations in Japan

References

External links
  

Railway stations in Japan opened in 1925
Railway stations in Osaka Prefecture
Tadaoka, Osaka